Rathdrum RFC is an Irish rugby team based in Rathdrum, County Wicklow.

External links
 Rathdrum RFC

Irish rugby union teams
Rugby union clubs in County Wicklow